Causeyella, is a genus of millipedes comprising three species:
Causeyella causeyae Shear, 2003
Causeyella dendropus (Loomis, 1939)
Causeyella youngsteadtorum Shear, 2003

References

Chordeumatida
Cave millipedes